Walter Bruce (29 November 1873 – 1 February 1941) was a Scottish footballer who played for Vale of Leven, Renton and St Mirren as a centre half. His elder brother Daniel was also a footballer who won the English FA Cup with Notts County in 1894 and later played for St Mirren, possibly being involved in Walter's move there in 1898 after Renton resigned from the Scottish Football League earlier that season.

He never took part in a major final, reaching the semi-final stage of the Scottish Cup once with Renton (in 1896) and three times with St Mirren (1898, 1900, 1901). He did win the Dumbartonshire Cup with Renton in 1896 and played in the 1903 Glasgow Merchants Charity Cup final which St Mirren lost 5–2 to Celtic. From the next season, he lost his regular place in the Buddies side to Robert Robertson. He made 140 appearances for the Paisley team in the two major competitions and scored 13 goals.

Bruce was selected for the Scottish Football League XI in 1902 and 1903, facing the Irish League XI on both occasions.

He continued to live in his birthplace of Bonhill and worked in the Singer Corporation sewing machine factory in Clydebank until his death in 1941.

References

1873 births
1941 deaths
People from Bonhill
Scottish footballers
Association football central defenders
Vale of Leven F.C. players
Renton F.C. players
St Mirren F.C. players
Scottish Football League players
Scottish Football League representative players
Footballers from West Dunbartonshire